is the twenty-eighth single by L'Arc-en-Ciel, released on May 18, 2005. It debuted at number one on the Oricon chart. The music video for "Jojoushi" was nominated for the 2005 Japan Media Arts Festival.

Track listing

References

2005 singles
L'Arc-en-Ciel songs
Oricon Weekly number-one singles
Songs written by Hyde (musician)
Songs written by Ken (musician)
2005 songs